Kajo Keji, also spelled Kajokaji, Kajukeji, Kajo-keji and Kago Kaju, is a town in South Sudan.

Location

Kajo Keji is part of the six counties of Central Equatoria (one of the ten states of South Sudan). It lies near the state border with Eastern Equatoria State and close to the international border with Uganda, to the south. The coordinates of Kajo Keji 

are:3°50'57.0"N, 31°39'28.0"E (Latitude:3.849167; Longitude:31.657778).

Payams 
1.liwolo

2.kangapo 1

3.kangapo 2

Bomas

√bori

√logu

√wudu

√jokat

4.ngepo

5.lire

Overview
Kajo Keji and the surrounding community are home to the Kuku people. The town is home to the headquarters of the Anglican Diocese of Kajo Keji, with Bishop Emmanuel Murye Modi being the prelate. Equity Bank South Sudan Limited maintains a branch in the town, being the only commercial bank in the county.

Population
, the population of Kajo Keji was estimated at 196,000.

See also
 Transport in South Sudan

References

External links
The Kajo Keji Project

Populated places in Yei River State